The 2022–23 UAE Pro League is the 48th edition of the UAE Pro League. Al Ain are the defending champions after winning their fourteenth title last season. This season will also have a mid-break due to the 2022 FIFA World Cup in Qatar.

Teams

Team changes

Promoted to the Pro League
Dibba Al Fujairah would get promoted back after winning the First Division league by beating Al Arabi 2–1, they would return after being absent for three seasons. Al Bataeh would secure promotion on the last day after beating Al Hamriyah 4–2, this will be their first ever season on the top flight in the clubs history.

Relegated to the First Division
Emirates would get relegated back to the First Division after a 0–1 home defeat to Al Urooba on the 17th of May. Al Urooba would also get relegated after losing to Al Dhafra 2–1 on the final matchday.

Stadia and locations

Note: Table lists clubs in alphabetical order.

Personnel and kits

Note: Flags indicate national team as has been defined under FIFA eligibility rules. Players may hold more than one non-FIFA nationality.

Foreign players

Players name in bold indicates the player is registered during the mid-season transfer window.
Players in italics were out of the squad or left the club within the season, after the pre-season transfer window, or in the mid-season transfer window, and at least had one appearance.

Managerial changes

League table

Results

Number of teams by Emirates

Seasonal statistics

Positions by round

Top scorers

Top assists

Clean sheets

Hat tricks

Notes
4 Player scored 4 goals(H) – Home team(A) – Away team

References

UAE Pro League seasons
1
UAE